Borophagini is a clade or tribe of the subfamily Borophaginae.

Biology
Borophagini were short-faced, heavy-jawed canids, usually massive in size. They were primarily carnivores but dentition demonstrates omnivore traits.

Taxonomy
Borophagini was named by Simpson (1945) [credited to Simpson because he named Borophaginae]. It was assigned to Borophaginae by Wang et al. (1999) and Wang et al. (2004).

Clade
The clade includes: Cormocyon, Desmocyon, Metatomarctus, Euoplocyon, Psalidocyon, Microtomarctus, Protomarctus, and Tephrocyon.

Subtaxa and sister taxa
The subtaxa or subtribes are: Aelurodontina, Borophagina, and Cynarctina. Phlaocyonini is a sister taxon.

Fossil distribution
With the clade comprising many genus and subtaxa, the distribution of fossil specimens for Borophagini is widespread throughout the entire continent extending from coast to coast as well as Florida to western Oregon to Panama.

Resources

 
Zanclean extinctions
Mammal tribes